was a town located in Enuma District, Ishikawa Prefecture, Japan.

As of 2003, the town has an estimated population of 9,801 and a density of 63.48 persons per km². The total area is 154.39 km².

On October 1, 2005, Yamanaka was merged into the expanded city of Kaga and no longer exists as an independent municipality.

See also 
Yamanaka Onsen

External links
 Yamanaka Onsen website 

Dissolved municipalities of Ishikawa Prefecture
Kaga, Ishikawa